John Davies Ormond (31 May 1831 – 6 October 1917) was a New Zealand politician whose positions included Superintendent of Hawke's Bay Province, Minister of Public Works and member of the New Zealand Legislative Council.

He represented the Clive electorate in Parliament from 1861 to 1881, when he was defeated (standing for the electorate of Waipawa).

He was appointed to the Legislative Council on 20 January 1891 and served until his death on 6 October 1917. He was appointed to the Council as one of seven new members (including Harry Atkinson himself) appointed to the Council by the outgoing fourth Atkinson Ministry; a move regarded by Liberals as a stacking of the upper house against the new government.

Ormond was baptised on 28 June 1831. He came from Wallingford, Oxfordshire, (then Berkshire), England, and established a homestead called Wallingford in Central Hawke's Bay in 1847, which became a major farming station.

Businessman and farmer Sir John Ormond, politician and farmer Tiaki Omana, and politician and Historic Places Trust chairman Ormond Wilson were his grandsons. His brother-in-law and husband of his sister was the Governor of Jamaica, Edward John Eyre. His second great-granddaughter is the Headmistress, Ormond Felicity Lusk. He married Hannah Richardson on 4 December 1860, the sister of Geordie Richardson. He died on 6 October 1917 at his home 'Tintagel' in Napier.

References

External links
 Wallingford Station, Ormond family history
 Biography in the 1966 in Encyclopaedia of New Zealand

|-

|-

1832 births
1917 deaths
Members of the New Zealand House of Representatives
Members of the New Zealand Legislative Council
Superintendents of New Zealand provincial councils
Members of the Cabinet of New Zealand
People from Wallingford, Oxfordshire
New Zealand MPs for North Island electorates
Independent MPs of New Zealand
Unsuccessful candidates in the 1881 New Zealand general election
19th-century New Zealand politicians
John Davies